Callisto denticulella is a moth of the family Gracillariidae. It is found in most of Europe, except the Balkan Peninsula and islands in the Mediterranean Sea. It is also known in Canada (Québec and Nova Scotia) and the United States (Vermont, Maryland and New Hampshire).

The wingspan is about 11 mm. The head is orange brown. Forewings ground colour evenly brown with three white striae at the costa and 2 very small striae near the apex; inner margin with a white dot at the base and two striae, on in the middle of the inner margin, the other at 2/3.

Adults are on wing from May to June.

Young larvae mine the leaves of Malus species. Other recorded food plants are Cotoneaster, Crataegus and Pyrus communis.

External links
 UKmoths
 leafmines.co.uk
 bladmineerders.nl
 
 

Gracillariinae
Moths of Europe
Moths of Asia
Moths described in 1794
Taxa named by Carl Peter Thunberg